= Rojibeg =

- village
- Location within Madhya Pradesh Location within India
- Coordinates: 23.3855746°N 77.3467996°E
- Country: India
- State: Madhya Pradesh
- District: Bhopal
- Tehsil: Huzur
- Elevation: 506 m (1,660 ft)

Population (2011)
  - Total: 155
- Time zone: UTC+5:30 (IST)
- ISO 3166 code: MP-IN
- 2011 census code: 482382

Rojibeg is a village in the Bhopal district of Madhya Pradesh, India. It is located in the Huzur tehsil and the Phanda block.

== Demographics ==
According to the 2011 census of India, Rojibeg had 38 households. The effective literacy rate (i.e. the literacy rate of population excluding children aged 6 and below) was 26.72%.

Demographics (2011 Census)
	Total	Male	Female
Population	155	79	76
Children aged below 6 years	39	16	23
Scheduled caste	5	3	2
Scheduled tribe	89	47	42
Literates	31	21	10
Workers (all)	86	44	42
Main workers (total)	75	39	36
Main workers: Cultivators	1	0	1
Main workers: Agricultural labourers	4	1	3
Main workers: Household industry workers	2	2	0
Main workers: Other	68	36	32
Marginal workers (total)	11	5	6
Marginal workers: Cultivators	0	0	0
Marginal workers: Agricultural labourers	2	0	2
Marginal workers: Household industry workers	0	0	0
Marginal workers: Others	9	5	4
Non-workers	69	35	34
